The surname Llorente (or Lorente) is derived from the Latin name Laurentius (Lorenzo in Spanish). This surname scattered over almost the entire Iberian Peninsula due to the reconquest, has an Aragonese origin recorded under different forms: Lorien, Lorient (sobrarbesa place names), Lorent or Llorent (forms in medieval Aragonese Ebro Valley). Because Castilian became increasingly important, the surnames came to be pronounced with an -e at the end.

People
 Alejandro Llorente y Lannas (1814–1901), Spanish Minister of State and writer
 Diego Llorente, Spanish footballer for Leeds United
 Fernando Llorente, footballer for Udinese
 José Luis Llorente, basketball player for the National Team of Spain
 Joseba Llorente Etxarri, retired Spanish footballer
 Juan Antonio Llorente (1756–1823), Spanish cleric and historian of the Spanish Inquisition
 Julián Volio Llorente, Costa Rican politician
 Marcos Llorente, Spanish footballer for Atletico Madrid
 Pedro Llorente, Spanish football manager
 Segundo Llorente (1906–1989), Spanish-born Alaskan missionary priest, Alaska State Legislator, and author

Places
 Llorente, Eastern Samar, Philippines
 Llorente, Colombia
 San Llorente, Spain

Spanish-language surnames